Qatari cuisine is made up of traditional Arab cuisine. Machbūs, a meal consisting of rice, meat, and vegetables, is the national dish in Qatar, typically made with either lamb or chicken and slow-cooked to give it a depth of flavour. Seafood and dates are staple food items in the country. Many of these dishes are also used in other countries in the region, because they share many commonalities. In other parts of the region some of the dishes have different names or use slightly different ingredients. One proponent of the importance of Qatar's culinary heritage is chef Noor Al Mazroei, who adapts traditional recipes to include vegan and gluten-free alternatives.

Qatari spice blends

Bizar 
Spices play an important role in many dishes and in Arabic cooking. Cooks will make sure to purchase best-quality spices and to make sure not to overbuy to preserve their freshness. Bizar is a combination of black pepper, coriander seeds, cinnamon sticks, clove, dried ginger, whole cardamom, dried red chili, and turmeric sticks. The spices are first washed, and then sun-dried, after which they are ground and mixed together.

Daqoos blend 
This is a red chili blend that includes roasted and crushed wheat, roasted and crushed cumin seeds, roasted and crushed sesame seeds, coriander seeds, crushed and dry red chili, garlic cloves, and finally salt.

Hisso 
This blend of spices includes dried ginger, cinnamon sticks, cardamom seeds, whole black pepper, turmeric sticks, and cumin seeds.

Main dishes

Qatari machbous 
Rice, meat, onions, and tomatoes mixed with spices. This dish is the local variation of kabsa.

Makbous 

Rice, meat, and vegetables mixed with spices. This dish is similar to biryani or pulao.

Ghuzi
Whole roast lamb served over nutty rice. Also called shuwaa.

Madrouba
Madrouba is a spicy and comforting Qatari porridge made with chicken, overcooked rice, and a plethora of flavorings such as turmeric, cumin, cardamom, ginger, cloves, cinnamon, garlic, and black pepper. It is recommended to serve madrouba while it is still piping hot, preferably garnished with fresh lime zest.

Harees
Harees is a dish made from grinding wheat seeds and mixing it with the fat (ghee). Salt and water is added, and it can be prepared with chicken or meat.

Jareesh
Jareesh is crushed wheat and is prepared with meat or chicken.

Khobes rgag
Khobos rgag is a thin flat bread that is made of flour, water and salt, and is also used in other dishes like thareed.

Thareed
Thareed is a mixture of khobes rgag and broth, vegetable, and either chicken or meat.

Drinks

Arabic coffee

Coffee brewed from dark roast coffee beans spiced with cardamom and served with dates.

Karak 
Karak , also known as "tea with milk" or "chai milk", is a bright orange mixture with cardamom, saffron, and sugar. It is tea simmered with a mixture of spices along with evaporated milk.

Desserts

Lugaimat
The ingredients used to create this sweet deep fried pastry are flour, milk, butter, sugar, saffron, and cardamom. After being fried and ready to be served, honey or a sweet syrup is poured on top of it.

Khabees
Khabees are seedless dates soaked in water, combined with roasted flour, and mixed with sugar, oil, butter, saffron, cardamom and rose water.

Asida
Asida is a sweet dish made with flour, oil and sugar.

Balaleet
Balaleet are noodles cooked with sugar, cinnamon, saffron, and cardamom. There is often an omelette on top.

Sago
Sago is sweet gelatin pudding spiced with saffron and cardamom. The original recipe was created by Mohamed Fathi, an Egyptian scientist.

Um ali 
Um ali is bread and rice pudding.

References

External links
https://www.marhaba.qa/souq-waqif-essential-common-spices-arab-cooking/ 
https://www.willflyforfood.net/qatar-machboos-a-delight-that-will-make-you-crave-for-more/ 
https://ar.hotels.com/go/qatar/best-food-doha
https://mybrowser-search.com/search?q=google&ac=1468047342
https://www.tasteatlas.com/madrouba

 
Arab cuisine
Middle Eastern cuisine
Cuisine by country